Pinkhill Lock is a lock on the River Thames in England. It is close to Farmoor, Oxfordshire.

The first lock was built of stone by Daniel Harris for the Thames Navigation Commission in 1791.

The weir is on the other side of the island and carries a public footbridge. The name Luck's or Lot's Hole is given to part of the weir stream.

History
The lock is named after a farm in the area and is on the site of a former weir and flash lock owned by Lord Harcourt who maintained rights over it. It is one of the Commission's early locks and like St John's was built by J. Nock. The lock was partially rebuilt in 1877 and a house was proposed at the same time. Previously the keeper lived at Eynsham and covered the whole stretch from Newbridge to King's Weir. A new cut was dug below the lock by 1899 when some reconstruction was carried out. The stone lock keeper's house dates from 1932.

Access to the lock
The lock can be reached (by authorised vehicles or on foot) from Farmoor on a track behind the reservoir.

Reach above the lock

The river winds past Farmoor Reservoir and Bablock Hythe where there used to be a ferry. This part of the river was frequented by Matthew Arnold and his "Scholar Gipsy".

The Thames Path crosses the river over the lock head gates to the northern bank towards Stanton Harcourt, and rejoins the river at Bablockhythe. It then continues alongside the river to Northmoor Lock.

See also
 Locks on the River Thames
 Crossings of the River Thames

Sources

References

External links 
 Weir behind Pinkhill Lock at geograph.co.uk

Locks on the River Thames
Locks of Oxfordshire
Pedestrian bridges across the River Thames